Swissvale is a station on the East Busway, located in Swissvale near Rankin.

There is a park and ride lot by the station.

References

Port Authority of Allegheny County stations
Martin Luther King Jr. East Busway